The Bank of Washburn is located in Washburn, Wisconsin. It was added to the National Register of Historic Places in 1980 and to the State Register of Historic Places in 1989.

References

Bank buildings on the National Register of Historic Places in Wisconsin
National Register of Historic Places in Bayfield County, Wisconsin
Romanesque Revival architecture in Wisconsin
Commercial buildings completed in 1890